Kilinochchi Madhya Maha Vidiyalaya, which is also known as Kilinochchi Central College earlier is a provincial school in Kilinochchi, Sri Lanka. Kilinochchi Madhya Maha Vidiyalaya was promoted to a National School in 2013.

Big Match 
Kilinochchi Madhya Maha Vidiyala plays the annual Cricket encounter with Kilinochchi Hindu College is known as the "Battle of Northern Blues".

See also
 List of schools in Northern Province, Sri Lanka

References

External links
 List of National Schools in Sri Lanka

Provincial schools in Sri Lanka
Buildings and structures in Kilinochchi
Schools in Kilinochchi District